Keith Fitzgerald is a former Democratic member of the Florida House of Representatives, representing the 69th District for two terms from 2007 to 2010.

Academic career
Keith Fitzgerald is also a political scientist specializing in American politics with a focus on institutions and public policy. He is the author of Face of the Nation: Immigration, the State, and the National Identity. Following a stint at Grinnell College, since 1994 Fitzgerald has been a professor of political science at the New College of Florida. He received his B.A. from the University of Louisville and his Ph.D. from Indiana University.

Florida legislature
In December 2005, Keith Fitzgerald announced his candidacy for the Florida State House, running as a Democrat in District 69, which contains the city of Sarasota, Florida and part of Manatee county. Fitzgerald narrowly defeated Republican Laura Benson 51% to 49% in the November 2006 election.

In 2008 Fitzgerald was re-elected, again running against Laura Benson. In 2010 however, he was defeated by Ray Pilon.

2012 U.S. House campaign

Fitzgerald won the Democratic nomination to challenge Vern Buchanan in Florida's 16th congressional district.

Polling
A mid-July 2012 poll showed the incumbent US Rep. Vern Buchanan leading Keith Fitzgerald by a margin of 54%-32%. The poll had a margin of error of +/-4.9%.

An independent poll released on September 5, 2012 showed the incumbent US Rep. Vern Buchanan leading Keith Fitzgerald by a margin of 56%-37%. The poll had a margin of error of 4%-5%.

Finance
As of August 3, 2012, Fitzgerald's campaign had $670,000 in the bank, compared to Buchanan's $1.4 million. Democratic Minority Leader Nancy Pelosi and other House Democrats have supported Fitzgerald with at least $34,000 in campaign contributions.

The Democratic Congressional Campaign Committee reserved $2.5 million of ad time in the Tampa Bay media market, some or all of which may be used to help Fitzgerald. Meanwhile, Buchanan's campaign reserved $4 million in the same market. As of early September 2012, there has been no public announcement of an ad buy from Fitzgerald's campaign.

Fitzgerald won 46.4% of the vote, but failed to defeat Rep. Buchanan.

References

External links
Florida House of Representatives - Rep. Keith Fitzgerald official FL House site
Keith Fitzgerald for State House official campaign website
 

Democratic Party members of the Florida House of Representatives
American political scientists
1956 births
Indiana University alumni
Living people
Grinnell College faculty
New College of Florida faculty
University of Louisville alumni